Coproica ferruginata is a species of lesser dung fly in the family Sphaeroceridae. It is found in Europe.

References

Sphaeroceridae
Taxa named by Christian Stenhammar
Diptera of North America
Diptera of South America
Diptera of Asia
Diptera of Africa
Insects described in 1854